New York's 39th State Senate district is one of 63 districts in the New York State Senate. It has been represented by Democrat James Skoufis, Republican William Larkin, and is currently represented by Robert Rolison.

Geography
District 39 is located in the Hudson Valley, including much of Orange County and smaller parts of Rockland County and Ulster County. The largest communities in the district are Monroe and the City and Town of Newburgh.

The district overlaps with New York's 17th, 18th, and 19th congressional districts, and with the 96th, 98th, 99th, 101st, 103rd, and 104th districts of the New York State Assembly.

Recent election results

2020

2018

2016

2014

2012

Federal results in District 39

References

39